Ben Tremain (February 25, 1888 - January 1971) was a member of the Wisconsin State Assembly.

Biography
Tremain was born on February 25, 1888, in Monroe County, Wisconsin. He would become a merchant and a farmer. He died in January 1971.

Political career
Tremain was a member of the Assembly from three times. First, from 1931 to 1932, second, from 1947 to 1954 and third, from 1957 to 1960. Previously, he had been President of Hustler, Wisconsin, where he was also a member of the school board and a member of the Juneau County, Wisconsin Board. He was a Republican.

References

People from Monroe County, Wisconsin
People from Juneau County, Wisconsin
County supervisors in Wisconsin
Republican Party members of the Wisconsin State Assembly
American merchants
Farmers from Wisconsin
1888 births
1971 deaths
20th-century American politicians